Acanthais callaoensis is a species of sea snail, a marine gastropod mollusk, in the family Muricidae, the murex snails or rock snails.

Description
The length of the shell attains 14.4 mm.

Distribution
This marine species occurs off the Galapagos Islands.

References

 Peña G.M. (1973). Gasterópodos marinos del Perú, con descripción de dos nuevas especies. Tesis Doctoral, Universidad Nacional Mayor de San Marcos, 342 p. Lima, Perú.

External links
 Gray, J. E. (1828-1830). Spicilegia zoologica; or, original figures and short systematic descriptions of new and unfigured animals. Treüttel, Würtz & Co. & Wood. Parts I & II: part I, 1–8, pls. 1–6 (1 July 1828); part II, 9–12, pls. 7–11 (August 1830).

callaoensis
Gastropods described in 1828